KBNT-CD (channel 17) is a low-power, Class A television station in San Diego, California, United States, affiliated with the Spanish-language Univision network. It is owned by Entravision Communications alongside UniMás affiliate KDTF-LD (channel 36); it is also sister to Milenio Televisión affiliate XHDTV-TDT (channel 49). XHDTV-TDT is owned by Mexican-based Televisora Alco, which is 40% owned by Entravision. All four stations share studios on Ruffin Road in San Diego's Kearny Mesa section, while KBNT-CD's transmitter is located on Mount Soledad in La Jolla.

The station's signal is relayed on low-powered KHAX-LD (channel 25) in Vista.

History
KBNT launched on May 19, 1987, as K19BN, owned by Cabrillo Broadcasting Corporation. The station obtained the Univision affiliation from Televisa-owned XEWT in Tijuana on January 1, 1990. The station obtained its call signal, KBNT-TV. At that time, San Diegans could receive the station only through cable television, because its weak broadcast signal could not reach the city proper. The station increased its transmitting power, boosting its signal. While still not reaching San Diego proper, it could be picked up in Escondido, San Marcos, Vista and Fallbrook.

On October 29, 1987, K49BV in Vista, owned by Vista Television, was launched. It was a repeater of the TBN network. In 1995, its call sign was changed to KHAX-LP.

On December 3, 1992, another low-power was created in San Diego. K17DI, owned by Community Broadcasting Co. of San Diego. It was a simulcast of Los Angeles-based KWHY-TV. It broadcast with a power of 11.9 kW, covering a major part of the city.

On December 23, 1994, K19BN reached an agreement with NBC affiliate KNSD (channel 39) to retransmit its programs on KBNT-LP (channel 62, later KNSD-LP in 1997) in La Jolla.

K19BN became KBNT-LP on August 22, 1997. That same year, ownership switched from Cabrillo to Entravision.

On June 28, 2000, major changes took place at Univision San Diego. The Univision affiliation switched from channel 19 (closed in 2001) to channel 17 (obtaining the KBNT-LP callsign and bought by Entravision), allowing Univision to reach San Diego, National City and Chula Vista over the air. This allowed then-The WB affiliate (now Fox affiliate) KSWB-TV (channel 69) to operate on digital channel 19.

The new KBNT-LP added KHAX-LP as its relay station, extending its coverage to the north. In 2002, KBNT-LP upgraded to Class A status, becoming KBNT-CA. KHAX-LP was sold to Entravision at the same time. The station's relay in La Jolla, KNSD-LP 62, was shut down in 2007. That signal was leased to Entravision by KNSD owners Station Venture Operations, L.P. (operated as a joint venture between NBCUniversal and LIN Media until LIN dropped out of the venture in February 2013).

In the fall of 2008, KBNT-CD expanded again to a three-repeater operation, when KTCD-LP switched from repeating Azteca America-affiliated sister station XHAS-TV (channel 33) to KBNT.

On March 4, 2020, analog channel 49 (KHAX-LP) was shut down and a new digital channel 25 (KHAX-LD) signed on in Vista, California.

On August 9, 2021, the Federal Communications Commission canceled the license for translator KTCD-LP (analog channel 46 in San Diego), as the station did not transition to digital operation by the July 13, 2021 deadline.

Newscasts
KBNT-CD broadcasts five hours of local newscasts each week (with one hour each weekday); the station does not produce newscasts on Saturdays or Sundays. The station produces the public affairs program Perspectiva Nacional on Sundays at 6:00 p.m.

Subchannels
The station's digital signal is multiplexed:

References

External links

Univision network affiliates
LATV affiliates
Stadium (sports network) affiliates
Comet (TV network) affiliates
This TV affiliates
TBD (TV network) affiliates
Low-power television stations in the United States
BNT-CD
Television channels and stations established in 1989
1989 establishments in California
BNT-CD
Entravision Communications stations